Marcel Ndalé (real name Gbokaho Minang Sylvain) is an Anti-balaka leader from Nana-Mambéré prefecture in the Central African Republic.

Life 
He was born in 1960 in Niem village in Nana-Mambéré province as Gbokaho Minang Sylvain. In 2006 he created a self-defense group to fight with zaraguina bandits together with his two brothers. They also were creating gri-gris amulets. They settled with their extended family in Bouar. In June 2013 following Séléka takeover of the Central African Republic he fled to the bush where he led group of Anti-balaka fighters. On 22 January 2014 he arrived in Bouar seizing former Séléka base. He was arrested by MINUSCA in April 2015 and placed in Nagaragba prison in Bangui where he escaped in 2015. He became Anti-balaka's zone commander in Nana-Mambéré together with two brothers forming Ndalé's clique (officially under command of Patrice-Edouard Ngaïssona, de facto acting independently), which mainly benefitted from imposing taxes on cattle trade. From 2015 to 2017 his group had stolen 4,000 head of cattle in the area, leading to clashes with 3R armed group. On 19 September 2017 his group clashed with armed forces who were deployed in Bouar two days earlier

On 15 December 2017 his group signed peace agreement with 3R armed group. On 3 October 2018 his group signed another ceasefire with 3R aimed at facilitating return of displaced people to Koui. He reportedly collected illegal taxes at Yongo, north of Bouar from people going to cattle market. On 16 September 2020 his 12 year old daughter and 18 year old son were kidnapped near Baboua, with son being released shortly after. He threatened to raise up his arms again if she's not released. In December 2020 he and his brother joined Coalition of Patriots for Change seizing Bouar. In January 2021 his group killed two herders and stole their cattle and detained and tortured individuals at their base in the Tropicana district for more than two weeks. On 5 May 2021 his fighters attacked Abba. As of August 2022 he remains active in Coalition of Patriots for Change. On 28 November 2022 he ordered an attack on vehicle with Chinese workers on Niem-Yelewa axis, during which one soldier was killed.

Family 
As of February 2014 he reportedly had a wife, Nafissatou Ndalé, and a brothers Ibrahim and Adouma Ndalé who also fought with him in Anti-balaka.

References 

Living people
1960 births
People from Nana-Mambéré
Leaders of Anti-balaka